The Health Services Act 1976 (c. 83) is an Act of the Parliament of the United Kingdom.

It deals primarily with issues relating to private medicine in the United Kingdom.  It established an independent Health Services Board to be responsible for the progressive withdrawal from NHS hospitals of pay beds.

References
Halsbury's Statutes,

United Kingdom Acts of Parliament 1976
NHS legislation
Private medicine in the United Kingdom